The Ford Kuga is a compact crossover SUV (C-segment) manufactured by Ford since 2008 mainly for the European market, and now in its third generation. Both front-wheel drive and four-wheel drive are offered.

The Kuga was originally European-designed and sold in Europe and a few other markets, but beginning in 2012 for the 2013 model year it was marketed in North America as the Ford Escape.

Name
The vehicle name, Kuga, may refer to another Ford automobile, the Mercury Cougar. The final Mercury Cougar from 1998 to 2002 was sold outside of the United States as the Ford Cougar. Kuga means plague in Serbo-Croatian and Slovenian. Its sales are reportedly lower in the region due to the unfortunate naming choice.

First generation (C394; 2008) 

The Kuga went on sale in the first half of 2008, and was built at Ford's plant in Saarlouis, Germany. In the United Kingdom, emphasising the car's premium market aspirations, only high end Zetec and Titanium specifications are offered. It is based on the C1 platform, which also forms the underpinnings of the Ford Focus and Ford C-Max.

The first-generation Kuga was presented in September 2007, having its world premiere at the Frankfurt Motor Show.

Engines 
Petrol
 2.5 L Duratec turbo I5, 

Diesel
 2.0 L Duratorq, 
 2.0 L Duratorq,  AWD and powershift models

Worldwide markets 
A report from 20 July 2007 indicated Ford executives were considering the prospects of sales in North America. This idea was later scrapped, after they determined the car could not be sold both competitively priced and at a profit in the United States, due to the current dollar-to-euro exchange rate.

On 24 July 2008, WDIV-TV announced that Ford was reconsidering bringing the Kuga to North America after all. On 22 October 2009, news leaked that Ford would build the Kuga at its Louisville plant, possibly as the 2012 Ford Escape.

On 23 June 2010, Ford announced it would end production of the second-generation Escape in 2011 in anticipation of the Kuga's North American launch as the next-generation Escape. The Ford Kuga has also been available in Argentina since 2010; in Japan, South Africa, and New Zealand since 2011; and in Australia since March 2012.

A facelift was released at the end of 2010, after being revealed in July 2010.

The redesigned Kuga formed the basis for the 2013 Ford Escape sold in the United States. Ford announced in May 2010 that it would build unspecified hybrids at a plant in Valencia, Spain, and likely offer a hybrid option of both vehicles. The Kuga Hybrid would be Ford's first hybrid to be sold in Europe, though it has sold over 100,000 Escape Hybrids and Mercury Mariner Hybrids in the United States since 2004.

Second generation (C520; 2012) 

The second-generation Kuga was primarily developed by Ford of Europe, developed under the "One Ford" policy, which stipulates that Ford designs only one model in each segment to be sold globally. The rebadged name Ford Escape is used in North America, replacing the model of the same name there.

The Kuga follows on from the Vertrek concept, developed over nine months at Ford's Cologne design studio. For the production model, designers and engineers in Cologne were responsible for the body design and C1 platform, the upper body and interior come from Detroit, and powertrains are manufactured by Ford Dagenham.

The patents from January 2011 list the designers as Patrick Verhee, Stefan Lamm, Kemal Curic, and Andrea Di Buduo from Ford in Germany. Final assembly for European models is conducted at the Ford Valencia Plant in Spain. Ford claims the Kuga and Escape have 80% parts commonality.

The Kuga is marketed as the Ford Escape in North America, Australia, Middle East, and several countries in the Americas.

Powertrain 
Petrol
 1.5 L EcoBoost turbo I4, 
 1.6 L EcoBoost turbo I4, 
 1.6 L EcoBoost turbo I4,  2WD and AWD models
 2.0 L EcoBoost turbo I4,  AWD models

Diesel
 2.0 L Duratorq, 
 2.0 L Duratorq, 
 2.0 L Duratorq, 
 2.0 L Duratorq, 

Ford Europe debuted the facelifted model at Mobile World Congress in Barcelona in February 2016.

Fire hazard

South Africa 
In South Africa, onwards from 2015, numerous Ford Kugas of the 1.6 L EcoBoost variant caught fire. In December 2016, Ford South Africa requested that all local Kuga owners take their vehicles in for a safety inspection. Even after one owner took her vehicle to a dealership, whose mechanics checked it and assured the owner that the vehicle was safe, the car still caught fire the next day.

Another owner was assured by a dealership that his vehicle would be safe as long as the coolant level was correct, but his Kuga burned a few days later. One driver is reported to have died as a result of a fire in his Kuga in December 2015. His vehicle allegedly exhibited several faults, but was checked by Ford and passed as safe shortly before the fire. Subsequently, further reports were made of fires and other failures occurring after safety checks at Ford facilities.

As of 16 January 2017, at least 46 Kugas in South Africa had been destroyed by fire, and Ford South Africa had confirmed that a total of 39 incidents had been reported to the company. By 18 January 2017, the number of incidents had reached 50, with 13 in 2017 alone. Between November 2015 and December 2017, 72 vehicles suffered fires. By 4 February 2019, there had been more than 80 incidents, with one as recently as 1 February 2019.

On 16 January 2017, Ford South Africa and South Africa's National Consumer Commission held a media briefing to announce a safety recall of the affected Kuga model, affecting "4556 1.6 L EcoBoost models that were built between December 2012 and February 2014". The NCC said that it had decided to exercise its authority to authorize a recall on safety grounds, and had then been informed that Ford South Africa had decided to implement a recall. Between January 2017 and January 2018, Ford implemented three safety recalls on the vehicles.

Ford South Africa identified the mechanism leading to the majority of fires as overheating caused by a lack of coolant circulation, which could lead to cracking of the cylinder head, resulting in an oil leak and subsequent fire in the engine compartment. The proposed solution would be first to replace and check affected components and systems, and later to improve the cooling and warning systems.

As of January 2018, six Kugas had caught fire, or suffered engine and electronic failures, after undergoing recall. In January 2017, Ford South Africa said that it was not aware of any injuries caused by the engine fires, and claimed that the fatal incident was not the result of an engine fire. The causes of both the fatal fire and others are disputed.

On 17 January 2017, video footage was released that allegedly recorded part of the fatal fire. In November 2018, family of the deceased owner claimed that Ford South Africa had offered them a settlement conditional on accepting that he had died from a gunshot wound. By this time, the family was represented by Advocate Gerrie Nel of AfriForum.

Some owners of affected vehicles, family of the deceased owner, and other parties have criticized the conduct of Ford South Africa.

A commissioner of the National Consumer Commission (NCC)  said that the matter should have been addressed sooner in view of the risk both to those travelling in affected Kugas, and to others. In court papers related to the fatal fire, the South African Police Service has alleged that Ford South Africa may have failed to comply with its obligations under South African consumer protection law, and obstructed the police investigation.

On 17 January 2017, family of the deceased owner held a media briefing together with an attorney, and announced plans to initiate a class-action lawsuit against Ford South Africa. Owners of models not included in the recall, but also damaged by fires, have expressed interest in joining such a suit. As of January 2018, Ford South Africa was offering affected owners a settlement, that included a non-disclosure agreement, and was criticized both as inadequate and as an attempt to forestall the class action.

On 2 March 2017, the NCC announced that it had begun an investigation into Ford South Africa's handling of the matter, after receiving numerous complaints alleging what the NCC described as "prohibited conduct". The NCC report was completed by April 2018, at which time Ford South Africa was contacting affected owners with offers of compensation.

On 4 February 2019, an inquest into the death of the driver in December 2015 opened in the Western Cape High Court at Cape Town, and was postponed to 18 March 2019. During this initial hearing, advocates for the various parties stated that some witness statements were outstanding, and made allegations about the circumstances of the death, the handling of the police investigation, and the conduct of Ford South Africa.

The outcome of the inquest would determine whether a public or private criminal prosecution might follow. In June 2020, at the conclusion of the inquest in the Western Cape High Court, Judge Robert Henney found that the fire was caused by an electrical fault between the vehicle's dashboard and windscreen, that the driver was probably overcome by fumes inside the vehicle, and that there was no evidence of "any act or omission amounting to an offence on the part of any person". Henney also found no evidence that the driver had done anything that could have led to his death. 

In December 2019, the National Consumer Commission (NCC) fined the Ford Motor Company of Southern Africa (FMCSA)  R35 million in connection with the numerous fires, in addition to compensation payments already offered to affected parties.

New Zealand 
Television New Zealand reported that a Ford Kuga Titanium 2013 burst into flames in December 2016.  The incident is being investigated by Ford NZ. Ford NZ say that the models being investigated in South Africa were built between 2012 and 2014 and fitted with a 1.6 L EcoBoost engine. They also say differences exist between the models sold in South Africa and those sold in New Zealand.

Until the investigation into the New Zealand incident has been completed, no decision can be made about recalling the 1,300 cars of the same model sold in New Zealand.

Third generation (CX482; 2019) 

The third-generation Ford Kuga made its debut on April 2, 2019; it went on sale in the third quarter of 2019 as a 2020 model for markets in North America (as the fourth-generation Escape for the region). There are five new engine transmission combinations, including a plug-in petrol electric hybrid that can go  on electricity, as well as a conventional hybrid and two turbocharged four-cylinder engines mated to eight-speed automatic transmissions along with Android Auto.

The third-generation Kuga is the company’s first SUV to use the C2 platform, also found in the latest Focus, making it longer, wider and with a more generous wheelbase. Ford claims that the new model is up to 90kg lighter than the outgoing Kuga.

Sales 

Chinese sales does not include the third-generation Kuga which is sold as the Escape.

References

External links 

 

Kuga
Kuga
Compact sport utility vehicles
Ford C1 platform
Front-wheel-drive vehicles
Goods manufactured in Germany
Cars introduced in 2008
2010s cars
Crossover sport utility vehicles